Rimington railway station was a railway station that served the small village of Rimington in Lancashire. It was built by the Lancashire and Yorkshire Railway. It was closed in July 1958, some four years prior to the withdrawal of passenger trains over the route.

Services

References 

Lancashire Steam Finale by Michael S. Welch

Disused railway stations in Ribble Valley
Former Lancashire and Yorkshire Railway stations
Railway stations in Great Britain opened in 1879
Railway stations in Great Britain closed in 1958